The 1935 Summer Deaflympics officially known as 4th International Games for the Deaf was an international multi-sport event that was held from 17 August 1935 to 24 August 1935. It was hosted by London, England, with events held at White City Stadium.

The tournament saw the debut of an American team.

Participating Countries
The following countries participated in the 1935 Deaflympics:
 Austria
 Belgium
 Denmark
 Finland
 France
 Germany
 Great Britain
 Hungary
 Netherlands
 Norway
 Sweden
 United States of America

Sports
The following events were included in the 1931 Deaflympics:

Individual sports 
  Athletics 
  Road cycling
  Diving 
  Swimming
  Tennis

Team sports 
  Football

Medal table

Results

Athletics

Cycling

Diving

Football

Swimming

Tennis

Notes

References

Deaflympics
Summer Deaflympics
Summer Deaflympics
International sports competitions hosted by England
Sports competitions in London
1930s in London
Summer Deaflympics
Summer Deaflympics